Korek is a Polish or Czech surname. Notable people with the surname include:

 Bettina Korek (born 1978), American arts advocate
 Dusty Korek (born 1995), Canadian ski jumper
 Jeff Korek, American lawyer

See also

Polish-language surnames
Czech-language surnames